Kuber Singh Rana  was the Inspector General of the Nepal Police. He was promoted to the Inspector General of Police by the government of Nepal after succeeding Rabindra Pratap Shah as the police chief on September 13, 2012. He joined Nepal Police on 16 November 1983 as Police Inspector.

Biography
Kuber Singh Rana was born in Baugha Gumha of Palpa district on 21 July 1960. He graduated from Tribhuvan University with a Bachelor of Arts degree. Rana joined Nepal Police on 16 Nov 1983 as an Inspector of Police. In his 30-year career in law enforcement, he established himself as an honest, hardworking and professional police officer epitomizing these virtues while serving in the various capacities within the organization.

Adjudging his strategic and managerial acumen, he was appointed as the Additional Inspector General of Police in 2011 and thus the police command of Kathmandu Valley was tendered to him as the Commissioner of Metropolitan Police Office, Kathmandu. He strived towards developing fair and professional police service as well as applying prudent resource management and mobilization to ensure effective service delivery and maintenance of law and order within the valley. Rana had served as In-Charge of seven District Police Offices and two Zonal Police Offices. He was promoted to the rank of Deputy Inspector General of Police in 2008 and served as the Chief of Western Regional Police Office, Pokhara. His exemplary police service is well remembered in the Western region.

In his professional career, Rana had participated in two dozen specialized training courses, within the country and abroad. In recognition to his service, he has been awarded 4 orders, 8 decorations and 3 medals on various occasions. He has received several appreciation letters for his performance.

As a chief of Nepal Police he highly envisions delivering fair and competent police service across the country. Protection and promotion of human rights along with zero tolerance against corruption and irregularity are key priority areas of Nepal Police. Rana visioned in bringing into practice a people-centric credible and professional police service in the country. In doing so, he has stressed on the continuity and further expansion of community policing, application of modern scientific tools and techniques in criminal investigation along with delegation of authority to the lower police command for prompt and effective delivery of service to the people. He has as a priority to bring the police reform initiatives into practice. Kuber Singh Rana believes that service delivery of the police must be the central policing agenda and thus police must be fully accessible to the public.

Earlier assignments and medals
 Metropolitan Police Commissioner
 Chief, Weastern Region Police Office, Pokhara
 Chief, Narcotics Drug Control Law Enforcement Unit 
 Chief of several District Police Offices.
 Kuber Singh Rana has been awarded with 16 medals/awards for his police duty.

Controversy
Two human rights groups have opposed Rana's appointment, as he was the Officer-in- charge, when five students from Dhanusa District of Nepal disappeared and found dead during a security operation conducted during 2003.

References

1960 births
Living people
People from Palpa District
Tribhuvan University alumni
Nepalese police officers
Chiefs of police
Inspectors General of Police (Nepal)